The Katavi mouthbrooder (Haplochromis katavi) is a species of cichlid fish endemic to Tanzania where it is found in the Lake Rukwa drainage.  This species can reach a length of  TL.

References

Katavi mouthbrooder
Endemic freshwater fish of Tanzania
Katavi mouthbrooder
Katavi mouthbrooder
Taxonomy articles created by Polbot